Coastal prairie may refer to either:

 The California coastal prairie, a plant community found along the coasts of California and Oregon
 The Western Gulf coastal grasslands of Louisiana, Texas, and Tamaulipas